Khanazir (also known as Ashrafiyah)  is a Syrian village located in Awj Nahiyah in Masyaf District, Hama.  According to the Syria Central Bureau of Statistics (CBS), Khanazir had a population of 397 in the 2004 census. Its inhabitants are predominantly Alawites.

References

Bibliography

 

Populated places in Masyaf District
Alawite communities in Syria